Coreopsis major is a North American species of tickseeds, in the family Asteraceae.  It is native to the eastern United States, from Louisiana to Virginia and as far inland as Indiana and Ohio. There are isolated populations in Pennsylvania, Long Island, and Massachusetts, most likely escapes from cultivation.

Coreopsis major is a perennial herb up to 90 cm (3 feet) tall with yellow flower heads.

References

major
Flora of the Eastern United States